KCIC may refer to:

 KCIC (FM), a radio station (88.5 FM) licensed to Grand Junction, Colorado, United States
 The ICAO code for Chico Municipal Airport, an airport in Chico, California
 Kereta Cepat Indonesia–China, a high-speed rail company in Indonesia